The Hawaii State Tax Appeal Court of the Hawaii State Judiciary has jurisdiction over cases involving property, excise, liquor, tobacco, income and insurance taxes.

See also
 Courts of Hawaii

External links

State appellate courts of the United States
Hawaii state courts
US state tax agencies
Tax courts
Courts and tribunals with year of establishment missing
Taxation in Hawaii